Sy Gomberg (August 19, 1918 – February 11, 2001) was an American Oscar-nominated film screenwriter, producer, and activist, who taught screenwriting to University of Southern California students for over a decades.

Gomberg was born in New York City, and grew up in Newark, New Jersey. He spent World War II in the First Motion Picture Unit in Hollywood. After the war, he was a contributor to Collier's Weekly and the Saturday Evening Post. In 1951, he received an Academy Award nomination for When Willie Comes Marching Home – which was based on a story Gomberg originally wrote for Collier's.  He was also nominated the same year for Best Screenplay for Summer Stock. He also created, produced and wrote the 1960s ABC legal drama The Law and Mr. Jones starring James Whitmore.

A supporter of the American Civil Liberties Union, Gomberg organized members of the film industry to march with Martin Luther King Jr., in Alabama.

In 1957 Gomberg married actress Maxine Cooper. They remained together until his death at age 82 in Brentwood, California. His wife had one son from her previous marriage; they had two daughters together.

Screenwriting

Films
 When Willie Comes Marching Home (1950)
 The Toast of New Orleans (1950)
 Summer Stock (1950)
 Because You%27re Mine (1952)
 Bloodhounds of Broadway (1952)
 Joe Butterfly (1957)
 Kathy O%27 (1958)
 Step Down to Terror (1958)
 The Wild and the Innocent (1959)
 Breakout (1970)
 Three Warriors (1977)
 Bender (1979)
 High Ice (1980)
 The Ghosts of Buxley Hall (1980)

Television
 The Law and Mr. Jones (1960-1962)
 Vacation Playhouse (1964)
 Good Heavens (1976)
 The Magical World of Disney  (1978, 1980)
 Small Wonder (1985)
 BraveStarr (1988)

Producer

Films
 Kathy O''' (1958)
 The Wild and the Innocent (1959)
 Three Warriors (1977)
 Bender (1979)
 High Ice (1980)
Television
 The Law and Mr. Jones (1960-1962)
 Accidental Family'' (1967-1968)

References

External links

1918 births
2001 deaths
American male screenwriters
First Motion Picture Unit personnel
20th-century American male writers
20th-century American screenwriters
University of Southern California faculty